Marvel's The Avengers (also known as Marvel Avengers Assemble in the UK and Ireland), or simply The Avengers, is a 2012 American superhero film, scripted and directed by Joss Whedon, based on the Marvel Comics superhero team of the same name. The film stars an ensemble cast consisting of Robert Downey Jr., Chris Evans, Mark Ruffalo, Chris Hemsworth, Scarlett Johansson, Jeremy Renner, Tom Hiddleston, Clark Gregg, Cobie Smulders, Stellan Skarsgård and Samuel L. Jackson. In The Avengers, Nick Fury (Jackson), director of the peacekeeping organization S.H.I.E.L.D., recruits Iron Man (Downey), Captain America (Evans), the Hulk (Ruffalo), and Thor (Hemsworth) to form a team that must stop Thor's adoptive brother Loki (Hiddleston) from subjugating Earth.

The Avengers, produced on a budget of $220 million, was released theatrically in the United States on May 4, 2012, and grossed a worldwide total of over $1.5 billion. The film has garnered numerous awards and nominations with most nominations recognizing the film itself, the performances of the cast (particularly those of Downey, Johansson and Hemsworth) and the film's visual effects. The Avengers was nominated for an Academy Award for Best Visual Effects and a BAFTA Award for Best Special Visual Effects. The film was also nominated for three Critics' Choice Movie Awards, five Empire Awards, six Kids' Choice Awards, six MTV Movie Awards (winning three), thirteen People's Choice Awards (winning three), six Saturn Awards (winning four), eleven Teen Choice Awards (winning two), and six VES Awards (winning two).

Accolades

Notes

References

External links
 

Avengers (comics) lists
Avengers (film series)
Marvel Cinematic Universe lists of accolades by film
Marvel Cinematic Universe: Phase One